K&L Gates LLP is an American multinational corporation law firm based in the United States, with international offices in Asia, Australia, Europe, the Middle East, and South America.  Its namesake firms are Kirkpatrick & Lockhart, a Pittsburgh-based firm founded as Kirkpatrick, Pomeroy, Lockhart & Johnson in 1946, and Preston Gates & Ellis, a Seattle firm founded in 1883 whose prominent partners included William H. Gates Sr., the attorney, philanthropist, and father of Microsoft co-founder Bill Gates.  Kirkpatrick & Lockhart merged with Preston Gates in 2007 to form K&L Gates, LLP.

Measured by headcount, it was the 12th largest law firm in the United States in 2018.  The firm delivers legal services at both an individual office level and through nine broad firmwide practice areas: Corporate and Transactional; Energy, Infrastructure and Resources; Finance; Financial Services; Intellectual Property; Labor, Employment and Workplace Safety; Litigation and Dispute Resolution; Real Estate; and Regulatory and Policy, each of which also include a number of subject matter and industry-based practice groups.

, the leaders of K&L Gates are James Segerdahl (global managing partner) and Michael Caccese (chairman, management committee).

History 

 1883: Harold Preston establishes a law office in Seattle, which eventually evolved into the firm Preston Gates & Ellis
 1946: Pittsburgh-based Kirkpatrick, Pomeroy, Lockhart & Johnson is founded
 2005: Kirkpatrick & Lockhart and Nicholson Graham & Jones (founded 1858) merge to become Kirkpatrick & Lockhart Nicholson Graham
 2007: On January 1, K&L Gates is formed in a merger between Kirkpatrick & Lockhart Nicholson Graham and Preston Gates & Ellis to form Kirkpatrick & Lockhart Preston Gates Ellis. The name was later shortened to K&L Gates.
 2008: In January, K&L Gates combined with Hughes & Luce, a Dallas-based firm of 150 attorneys with offices in Austin, Dallas, and Fort Worth
 2008: In July K&L Gates combined with Kennedy Covington Lobdell & Hickman LLP, a North Carolina-based firm of 200 attorneys with offices in Charlotte, Raleigh, and Research Triangle Park.
 March 1, 2009: K&L Gates merged with Bell, Boyd & Lloyd, a Chicago-based firm with approximately 215 attorneys with offices in Chicago, San Diego and Washington, D.C.
 2013: K&L Gates combined with Australian national firm Middletons with offices in Melbourne, Sydney, Perth, and Brisbane

Ratings and rankings
U.S. News has given the firm "Tier 1" national ratings in 42 different practice areas, placing it in the top 3 law firms with the most Tier 1 rankings.  The firm garnered 129 first-tier ratings at the regional/city level across 59 practice groups.  Chambers has given the firm a tier 1 national ranking for its Shipping & Maritime Transportation practice, as well as regional tier 1 rankings in: Corporate/Commercial (WA), Environmental (NJ), Bankruptcy and Healthcare (NC), Insurance, Litigation and Corporate (PA).

The firm is ranked #34 in the Top 100 "most prestigious law firms in the country based on the assessments of lawyers at peer firms" by Vault.com.

For three consecutive years (2017-2019) U.S. News has ranked K&L Gates as the top law firm in the U.S. for environmental litigation ("Law Firm of the Year - Environmental Litigation").   The firm has been named among the "Pacific Northwest Elite" by the website Above the Law, which noted the firm as the "Best Firm for Lobbying Congress in Your Favor".

The firm ranks #41 in the American Lawyer "Global 200" rankings, which ranks firms worldwide by revenue. The legal news site Above the Law ranked the firm number 71 in its 2018 "Power 100" law firm rankings.  The Financial Times labeled K&L among the "Most innovative North American law firms 2015: Compliance & technology".

K&L Gates received a 100% rating in the 2018 Corporate Equality Index compiled by the Human Rights Campaign Foundation, an LGBT advocacy group. In 2016 the Yale Law Women organization included K&L Gates in the top ten family-friendly law firms.  Vault.com has described the firm's “great work-life balance” and "pleasant culture" while also noting a "lack of transparency" at the firm.

Projects
In 2012 K&L Gates represented Carnegie Mellon University in a patent suit resulting in a jury verdict awarding $1.17B to the university, one of the largest such verdicts at the time.

In September 2014, K&L Gates founded the "Cyber Civil Rights Legal Project". The project initially involves about fifty K&L lawyers working pro bono to assist about 100 victims of "revenge porn". According to the New York Times, the project is believed to be first of its kind at a major United States law firm. By 2016, the project has aided hundreds of victims and has led to a handful of arrests. In April 2017 the project secured an $8.9 million jury award for a King County couple, reportedly the largest award for non-celebrity targets of "revenge porn" to date.

In 2016, K&L Gates awarded a $10 million grant to Carnegie Mellon University (CMU) to establish the "K&L Gates Endowment for Ethics and Computational Technologies". This new research center is to explore the ethics of artificial intelligence and establish a biennial conference. The firm has provided legal services to CMU for decades; K&L Gates Chairman Emeritus Charles J. Queenan Jr. once chaired CMU's Board of Trustees.

In 2017, K&L Gates announced it would create its own blockchain.

Political contributions
According to OpenSecrets, K&L Gates was one of the law firms contributing the most to federal candidates during the 2012 election cycle, donating $1.09 million, 52% to Democrats. By comparison, during that same period Akin Gump Strauss Hauer & Feld donated $2.56 million, 66% to Democrats, while oil conglomerate ExxonMobil donated $2.66 million, 88% to Republicans. Since the 1990 election cycle, K&L Gates contributed nearly $12.9 million to federal campaigns, and spent $1.25 million on lobbying since 1999.

Lawsuits 
K&L Gates has faced several lawsuits from former clients, including accusations of breaching fiduciary duties, overbilling, and malpractice.

In January 2020, a worker with anxiety and ADHD sued K&L Gates for disability bias and retaliation after seeking a work-from-home accommodation; the suit was later settled out of court. In November 2020, former partner Willie E. Dennis sued the firm alleging that his May 2019 termination was "for complaining about discrimination against Black attorneys and for opposing the sexual harassment of female employees."

Notable lawyers and alumni

The following attorneys were affiliated with K&L Gates and its immediate predecessor firms, including, e.g., Preston Gates & Ellis; Nicholson Graham & Jones; Kennedy Covington; Hughes & Luce;  Bell, Boyd & Lloyd; and Middletons:

Bart Gordon, former twelve-term U.S. Congressman
Betty Binns Fletcher, United States Circuit Judge of the San Francisco-based United States Court of Appeals for the Ninth Circuit between 1979 and 2012.  First woman partner of Preston Gates & Ellis (which merged to become K&L Gates).
Ignasi Guardans, former Spanish and European Member of Parliament
J. Nicholas Ranjan, Judge, United States District Court for the Western District of Pennsylvania
Bill Neukom, former American Bar Association president and managing partner of the San Francisco Giants
Dick Thornburgh, former Attorney General of the United States and two-term Governor of Pennsylvania
Eric Schneiderman, the former New York Attorney General
Jerry McDevitt, personal attorney of Vince McMahon and the WWE. Makes frequent television appearances on behalf of the company.
Jack Abramoff, former lobbyist, writer
James T. Walsh, longtime U.S. Representative from Syracuse, New York
John Michael McHugh, United States Secretary of the Army, nominated by President Barack Obama
Michael S. Greco, former American Bar Association president
Michael C. Ormsby, U.S. Attorney for the Eastern District of Washington
Neal Brendel, former player and chairman of USA Rugby, founder of firm's Dubai office
Rick Santorum, former two-term U.S. Representative, former two-term U.S. Senator and 2012 Republican presidential candidate
Robert William Davis, longtime US Representative from Michigan
Slade Gorton, former two-term U.S. senator
William H. Gates Sr, attorney and philanthropist. One of the founders of Preston Gates & Ellis (which merged to become K&L Gates). He is the father of Microsoft co-founder Bill Gates.
Thomas W. Pomeroy Jr, a founding partner of original Kirkpatrick, Pomeroy, Lockhart & Johnson firm in 1946; served as Pennsylvania Supreme Court Justice from 1968-78.
Lloyd Meeds, former U.S. Representative for Washington’s 2nd Congressional district from 1965 to 1979 and partner in the law firm of Preston Gates Ellis, & Rouvelas Meeds, the D.C. office of Seattle-based Preston Gates & Ellis.

References

External links
Law.com Profile
Vault.com Profile
Above the Law Profile
Chambers Profile

Law firms established in 2007
Law firms based in Pittsburgh
Foreign law firms with offices in Hong Kong
Foreign law firms with offices in Japan
American companies established in 2007